Mohammad Shahid (born 1 November 1988) is a First-class cricketer from Bangladesh. He is a right-handed batsman and also right-arm medium-fast bowler.

Domestic career
Shahid made his first-class debut on 17 October 2011 against Rangpur Division.

He was the leading wicket-taker for Legends of Rupganj in the 2017–18 Dhaka Premier Division Cricket League, with 29 dismissals in 16 matches.

In October 2018, he was named in the squad for the Comilla Victorians team, following the draft for the 2018–19 Bangladesh Premier League. He was the leading wicket-taker for Legends of Rupganj in the 2018–19 Dhaka Premier Division Cricket League tournament, with 27 dismissals in 15 matches.

International career
In April 2015, Shahid was named in the Bangladesh's Test squad for their series against Pakistan. He made his Test debut against Pakistan in the Sheikh Abu Naser Stadium on 28 April 2015. He made his Twenty20 International debut for Bangladesh against Zimbabwe on 20 January 2016.

References

External links
 

1988 births
Living people
Bangladeshi cricketers
Bangladesh Test cricketers
Bangladesh Twenty20 International cricketers
Dhaka Division cricketers
Dhaka Metropolis cricketers
People from Narayanganj District
Dhaka Dominators cricketers
Sylhet Strikers cricketers
Brothers Union cricketers
Gazi Tank cricketers
Legends of Rupganj cricketers
Bangladesh Central Zone cricketers
Comilla Victorians cricketers